Irene Headin was a Canadian pitcher who played in the All-American Girls Professional Baseball League. She batted and threw right-handed.

Born in Saskatoon, Saskatchewan, Irene Headin was one of the 68 players born in Canada to join the All American League in its twelve-year history. She pitched for the South Bend Blue Sox in the 1945 season and recorded an inning of work without a decision.

In 1988, Headin received further recognition when she became part of Women in Baseball, a permanent display based at the Baseball Hall of Fame and Museum in Cooperstown, New York which was unveiled to honor the entire All-American Girls Professional Baseball League. She later gained honorary induction into the Canadian Baseball Hall of Fame in 1998 along with the other Canadian AAGPBL players.

Sources

All-American Girls Professional Baseball League players
South Bend Blue Sox players
Baseball people from Saskatchewan
Canadian baseball players
Sportspeople from Saskatoon
Date of birth missing
Possibly living people
Year of birth missing